The Waterford & Suir Valley Railway (WSVR) is a registered charity operating a  gauge railway along approximately 10 km of track from Kilmeadan back towards Waterford, Ireland. The line shares much of its route along the banks of River Suir with the Waterford Greenway. This passes through the station which has car parking and a coffee shop for visitors.

Apart from the station platforms, there are two other halts, built in 2017, at Mount Congreve and Bilberry on the outskirts of Waterford. The railway uses diesel locomotives. In addition to regular scheduled services, the railway also operates the 'Spooky Express' and 'Santa Express' services. The carriages are wheelchair accessible.

History 
The society was established in 1997 with the intention of restoring the Waterford and Tramore Railway, but after feasibility studies this was deemed impractical due to changes in road layouts made since the line's closure.

The Waterford - Dungarvan rail route was then explored and agreement was reached to try to restore a section of the historic line which was integral in connecting travelers from London to Killarney made popular as a holiday destination by Queen Victoria and was the first line to have luxury dining cars in Ireland. This line also carried mail from the UK and Ireland to the Americas via Cobh.

The society laid its first track in 2000 and by the end of 2003 it had laid over 8 km of track from Kilmeadan to Gracedieu Junction. It ran its first public trains in May that year.

In 2004, a further 2 km of track were laid as far as Bilberry. In 2008, the railway carried its 100,000th passenger, and in 2010 opened a maintenance and storage shed for its rolling stock. In 2016, the WSVR received planning permission for a new station building at Kilmeadan for which it is seeking to raise funds.

In March 2017, the Waterford Greenway opened on the 46 km of track bed built for the Waterford to Dungarvan rail line with walkers and cyclists sharing much of the last 10 km with the heritage railway as it heads towards Waterford City. Kilmeaden station is a meeting point with users of the Greenway and visitors to the railway availing of the station's facilities.

The railway is a registered charity, with a voluntary board of directors, with the purpose of preserving a part of Waterford's industrial heritage and educating visitors on its history. In 2016, the railway carried over 24,000 passengers and by 2018 this number had risen to just under 30,000.

The new Whistlestop cafe and facilities were completed in 2020, partly funded by the 'Dormant Accounts Fund', which helped meet the needs of the growing number of visitors to the Greenway especially during the COVID restrictions, when the shop was permitted to be open.

Route 
The entire route is on the track bed of the former  gauge Waterford, Dungarvan & Lismore Railway, which was opened in 1878 and closed in 1967, though a section remained open until 1987 for magnesite ore processing at the Quigley plant in Ballinacourty. This plant closed in 1982 though occasional weed spraying trains ran on the line up until May 1990. The WSVR uses the original railway station at Kilmeadan though the original goods yard is now a private dwelling.

The Dan Donovan Tunnel under the Waterford Bypass was specifically built to facilitate the line's continued operation towards Waterford City.

Though the line extends as far as a new platform at Bilberry just to the east of Waterford City, scheduled trains mostly run as far as Gracedieu Junction before turning back. Some pre-booked trains run the full length of the line to accommodate groups arriving by coach at the Bilberry coach and car park. Apart from the passing loop in Kilmeaden, the line is single track for the length of the route.

Future development 
New platforms were completed along the line at Mount Congreve Gardens and Bilberry where the local council has also created a coach parking area. Further halts are planned for the Woodstown Viking site and Waterford Institute of Technology Carriganore Campus.

In late 2020, with the support of Wexford County Council and Irish Rail, the engineering team were able to salvage track from Rosbercon (New Ross) station being lifted as part of the preparation for the Waterford to New Ross Greenway. This track is due to be used for the creation of an additional passing loop which is expected to be necessary for the preparations to return steam to the line with efforts underway to source a suitable locomotive for restoration as funds become available. The charity is attempting to source additional infrastructure including a water tower and turntable.

In 2021, the station is due to be connected to the nearby village of Kilmeaden by an extension of the Greenway undertaken by Waterford Council.

Rolling stock and infrastructure 
Rolling stock consists of three diesel locomotives and two purpose-built semi-open bogie passenger carriages.  A number of permanent way wagons are kept inside the shed at Kilmaedan. Two other diesel engines are stored for restoration. The rolling stock received a new livery in 2020 as part of a rebranding exercise. 

At Kilmeadan Station, an ex-Irish Rail grounded MkII carriage, No. 4106, is used as a ticket office and refreshment room.

Most of the track is bullhead track using a variety of cast iron chairs fastened to hardwood sleepers, including examples from the Great Southern and Western Railway, the Dublin and South Eastern Railway and more recent examples from CIÉ. Some sections use newer flat bottomed rail. All the points are manually operated.

Volunteers 
The railway is operated by over 50 trained volunteers of differing ages and interests. These volunteers are assisted by a smaller number of paid staff.

Gallery

See also
 List of heritage railways in the Republic of Ireland

References

External links 

 

Transport in County Waterford
Heritage railways in the Republic of Ireland
3 ft gauge railways in Ireland